Creemos is a right-wing political party consisting of the Solidarity Civic Unity (UCS) and Christian Democratic Party (PDC) in Bolivia. It was previously an alliance, which fielded Luis Fernando Camacho as its candidate for president during the 2020 Bolivian general election where he garnered 14% of the vote.

Constituent parties
Creemos consists of the following parties:

Regional partners
Creemos is also allied with several smaller parties that contest regional elections:

Electoral results

Presidential elections

Legislative elections

References

2020 establishments in Bolivia
Anti-communist parties
Conservative parties in Bolivia
Federalist parties
Political parties established in 2020
Political party alliances in Bolivia
Regionalist parties